"What a Great Night" is a song by Australian group, Hilltop Hoods. It was released in 2006 as the third single from their fourth studio album, The Hard Road.

The song was given a positive review by The Dwarf.

Music video
The video for the song includes footage of the group performing live and together in a nightclub setting. As an editing technique, the camera pans vertically to reveal a new set or location.

Track listing

On the re-release of The Hard Road entitled The Hard Road: Restrung, there is a verse by Pressure replacing Suffa's second verse.

Personnel
 Artwork (Graphic Design) - Benjamin Funnell 
 Artwork (Illustration) - John Engelhardt 
 Mastered - Neville Clark

References

External links
 Music video
 Live performance on JTV

2006 singles
2006 songs
Hilltop Hoods songs
Songs written by Suffa
Songs written by MC Pressure
Obese Records singles